The 2021 Bethune–Cookman Wildcats football team represented Bethune–Cookman University in the 2021 NCAA Division I FCS football season. The Wildcats played their home games at Daytona Stadium in Daytona Beach, Florida, and competed in the East Division of the Southwestern Athletic Conference (SWAC). They were led by sixth-year head coach Terry Sims.

Schedule

Game summaries

at UTEP

at UCF

Alabama A&M

at Alabama State

at South Carolina State

Mississippi Valley State

Prairie View A&M

at No. 24 Jackson State

Alcorn State

at Grambling State

vs. No. 23 Florida A&M

References

Bethune-Cookman
Bethune–Cookman Wildcats football seasons
Bethune-Cookman Wildcats football